Nawrocki (feminine Nawrocka, plural Nawroccy) is a Polish-language surname. It likely originated from a place name, Nawra or Nawry, deriving from the verb nawracać, nawrócić, meaning "to turn, revert, convert," often referring to a change in religion or conversion. In 1990, there were 21,798 Poles by this name, living all over Poland. In 2011, the number of Poles with this name living in Poland had fallen to 19,830, and as of 2022 is 17,240.

People
 Alexander Navrotsky (1839–1914), Russian poet and playwright 
 Alexandra Navrotsky (born 1943), American physical chemist 
 Irena Nawrocka (1917–2009), Polish fencer
 Jacek Nawrocki (born 1965), Polish volleyball player and coach
 Jan Nawrocki (1913–2000), Polish fencer
 Janusz Nawrocki (born 1961), Polish footballer
 Maik Nawrocki (born 2001), Polish footballer
 Mike Nawrocki (born 1966), director and co-creator of VeggieTales
 Ryszard Nawrocki (1940–2011), Polish actor
 Sławomir Nawrocki (born 1969), Polish fencer

References

Polish-language surnames